Robert Brendel (c. 1821–1898) and his son Reinhold Brendel (c. 1861–1927) were botanical modelmakers in first Breslau then Grunewald Berlin.

They produced accurate, large-scale models of plant structures. These were sold to technical universities teaching practical botany.

See also
Leopold and Rudolf Blaschka

References
Henri Reiling, 2003  "Beter dan de natuur" in: Jan Brand & Alex de Vries (eds), NEO, pp. 221–235 Utrecht: Centraal Museum, 2003  

19th-century German botanists
1820s births
1898 deaths
Businesspeople from Wrocław
People from the Province of Silesia